Stone Lake is a reservoir in Rio Arriba, New Mexico. The lake is located inside the Jicarilla Apache Reservation.

The lake contains a boating ramp and has populations of rainbow trout.

References

Reservoirs in New Mexico
Lakes of Rio Arriba County, New Mexico
Jicarilla Apache